Sang Lin is the romanization of various Chinese names. It may refer to:

 Sang Lin (桑林), a deity of ancient Chinese myth
 Lin Sang (林桑), an Olympic archer